The men's 3 metre springboard, also reported as plongeons du tremplin (English: trampoline diving), was one of five diving events on the diving at the 1924 Summer Olympics programme. The competition was actually held from both 3 metre and 1 metre boards. Divers performed six compulsory dives - standing backward plain dive, standing forward dive with twist, standing inward piked dive with twist, standing reverse piked dive, standing reverse plain dive with twist (3 metre board) and a standing forward somersault piked dive (1 metre board) - two jury-drawn dives and four dives of the competitor's choice for a total of twelve dives. The competition was held on Wednesday 16 July 1924, and Thursday 17 July 1924.

A point-for-place system was used. For each dive, the divers were ranked according to their dive score and awarded points based on their rank for that dive (the best dive earned 1 point, the next-best 2 points, and so on).

Seventeen divers from nine nations competed.

Results

First round

The three divers who scored the smallest number of points in each group of the first round advanced to the final.

Group 1

Group 2

Group 3

Final

References

Sources
 
 

Men
1924
Men's events at the 1924 Summer Olympics